The São Paulo Brazil Temple (formerly the São Paulo Temple) is the 19th constructed and 17th operating temple of the Church of Jesus Christ of Latter-day Saints (LDS Church). Located in the Brazilian city of São Paulo, it was the first LDS temple built in South America, and also the first temple to use the single story, single spire design. The spire is 101 feet (31 m) tall.

History
The intention to construct a temple in São Paulo was announced by the LDS Church on March 1, 1975, with construction beginning twelve months later. Hundreds of local church members gathered to clear the site, which included removing brush, weeds, and banana trees. Hundreds more members donated their time to produce fifty thousand blocks of cast stone composed of quartz, marble chips, and white concrete for the exterior of the temple. It was dedicated on October 30, 1978, by church president Spencer W. Kimball. The temple has two ordinance rooms and four sealing rooms, and has a total floor area of 59,246 square feet (5,504 m2).

On August 20, 2003, a gold-leafed statue of the angel Moroni was added to the temple during an extensive renovation and enlargement project 25 years after its dedication. Church president Gordon B. Hinckley rededicated the São Paulo Brazil Temple on February 22, 2004.

In 2020, the São Paulo Brazil Temple was closed temporarily during the year in response to the coronavirus pandemic.

Presidents
Former temple presidents include Helio R. Camargo (1990–93); Athos M. Amorím (1993–96); and Jairo Mazzagardi (2006–09).

See also

 Comparison of temples of The Church of Jesus Christ of Latter-day Saints
 List of temples of The Church of Jesus Christ of Latter-day Saints
 List of temples of The Church of Jesus Christ of Latter-day Saints by geographic region
 Temple architecture (Latter-day Saints)
 The Church of Jesus Christ of Latter-day Saints in Brazil

References

External links
 
São Paulo Brazil Temple Official site
São Paulo Brazil Temple at ChurchofJesusChristTemples.org

20th-century Latter Day Saint temples
Religious buildings and structures in São Paulo
Religious buildings and structures completed in 1978
Temples (LDS Church) in Brazil
1978 establishments in Brazil